Ktenoura is a genus of trilobite from the Silurian of Europe.

References
 Fossils (Smithsonian Handbooks) by David Ward (Page 59)
 Ktenoura in the Paleobiology Database

Cheiruridae
Silurian trilobites of Europe
Prehistoric animals of Europe
Phacopida genera